Meraklije are the organized supporters of the Niš professional football club Radnički Niš, and are one of the major supporter groups in Serbia. Meraklije is plural of the singular form meraklija, which means something like "neko kome je sve po meri, neko ko uživa u nečemu", which roughly translates to "someone to just everything is right, someone who enjoys something"; a person in this state is called a meraklija. Besides the football club, they also support other sport sections in Niš. They are also known for their special support to the Serbian national handball team.

History

The rise in the 1960s

The first large organized support happened in 1962 against Vardar, where several thousand fans from Niš occupied Skoplje. In 1962, Radnički Niš were promoted to the Yugoslav First League for the first time in their history and attracted thereby more supporters from Niš and its surroundings. Already on 23 September 1962, the fans displayed their first big choreography on the first league match against Red Star Belgrade. On the eastern stand has emerged a transparent "Real sa Nišave", which translates to "Real from Nisava", which a length of 20 meters and a height of 2 meters. The transparent could be seen at every home game throughout the 60s. Since Radnički's entry to the Yugoslav First League, the stadium was well attended.

1980s and the establishment

Legendary is the support beginning of the 80s, in the Yugoslav First League (season 1979-80 and 1980-81) and during the UEFA Cup from 1980–1983, with great atmosphere and cheering. Radnički Niš played 22 games across Europe against teams like  S.S.C. Napoli, Dundee United, Grasshoppers Zürich, Feyenoord Rotterdam and other clubs. During this time, Radnički Niš lost in three years only one UEFA Cup home match of total 11 and this against a Yugoslavian team. A great contribution to this success had the Radnički Niš fans with their support. Their support includes the use of large and small flags, chanting and different sound elements. The Čair Stadium was a tough ground for the opposition and the atmosphere created by Radnički Niš fans in a cracking stadium always gave hope to the team that they could overcome anybody. They achieved even the semifinals of UEFA Cup in 1982. In the first leg Radnički Niš won against Hamburger SV in front of 38,500 enthusiastic Radnički fans with 2-1, but they clearly lost the second leg. Radnički Niš fans attracted in this period for the first time also throughout Europe attention. Also legendary were the victory celebrations accompanied by Gajde, a traditional instrument that is typical for the region. After these great years, Radnički Niš relegated in 1984 in the Yugoslav Second League. A large organized support, after 1984, even with excellent attendance statistics, has been absent until 1989. That year in September, three days before the championship match against Red Star Belgrade, a decision was made that the club should have an organized fan group and that it should be shoulder-to-shoulder with the other fan organizations in Yugoslavia. There were several suggestions for a name,  but the name Meraklije was chosen after a one-sided decision, as the group's name, mainly due to traditional reasons from the city of Niš. The name was originally proposed by Caci, a former well-known supporter. Meraklije is plural of the singular form Meraklija, which means something like "neko kome je sve po meri, neko ko uživa u nečemu", which roughly translates to "someone to just everything is right, someone who enjoys something". A person in this state are called a Meraklija. After a short time, the Meraklije had over 2000 members.

1990s

With the decay of Yugoslavia during the war (1992–1995), the inflation and the UN sanctions, gathered clearly fewer Meraklije. This occurrences hit the state and his population hard and thereby also the sport. The next generation of Meraklije made their appearance at Čair's stands in 1995. Since that day, the Meraklije are gaining more adepts and are also becoming more active in the club's operations. Already then, they are constantly refreshed by new, younger fans. When the competition started in 1996, Radnički Niš was playing in the second league, but the Meraklije went to all games across Serbia. Time spent in the second league was short and the club's promotion to the first league meant that fans came in bigger numbers in the following seasons. The higher quality of football also brought younger fans to the stadium, as the Meraklije continued to grow and offered new jerseys and scarves to its members in a successful attempt to look better in the stands. In 1999-00, the Meraklije reach their climax. After ten years of cooperation and living life together, their biggest honour is surely that the footballers and management are very proud of them. Thanks to good relations with the club's management, the Meraklije get their own center in the city, and no game is left unattended.

Characteristics

The Meraklije are viewed as one of the most loyal followers in Serbia. Through thick and thin, they were regularly at the stadium, supporting their team. The logo of the Meraklije includes the colors red and white, which are also the colors of the club, the logo of Radnički Niš with the Niš Fortress and the flag of Serbia. The group's traditional colors are therefore mostly red in combination with blue and white, which may differ from the official team equipment worn on match days. In addition to the acoustic support, like chanting and singing, which is often coordinated by a so-called "Vodja" (Serbian: leader) by a megaphone or microphone and accompanied by drums, the Meraklije put also emphasis on visual aids, such as  waving large or small flags, displaying of banners and the creation of colorful choreographies, with many other activities along the way.

Friendships
The Meraklije are in a brotherhood with the organized fan groups of Spartak Subotica, the Marinci, and the Varvari who support Budućnost Podgorica from Montenegro. The friendship between the Meraklije and Marinci dates back to 1994, when Spartak and Radnički Niš played for the entering into the cup final. The Meraklije and the Marinci used the opportunity to celebrate the 20th anniversary of his fraternity by cheering together at the same stand during the first football match between their clubs in the 2012–13 Serbian SuperLiga season. The friendship between the Meraklije and the Varvari started during a game where the Meraklije were especially hospitable. They gave the Varvari catering, lodging and support in every way, of course the Varvari have not forgotten this exemplary behavior. Also the historical and cultural closeness of Serbia and Montenegro, known as brother nations, has contributed much to the brotherhood. Recently also started good relations with the fans of Radnički Kragujevac, the Crveni Đavoli. Their relations began mainly through the mutual support of the growing local patriotism in the last years of the Serbian fan scene. To the two clubs can be drawn various parallel. The clubs connects next to the club name also the founding years of the two clubs in 1923. Also both supporter groups were founded in the same year, in 1989.
The name Radnički means "Labourers" in Serbian and its roots come from the relation with the Labour movement that the clubs had during the first half of the 20th century. Their often mentioned slogan is: "Radnička deca, radnička braća", which translates to "Workers children, workers brothers". All reasons, why the first top tier match between these clubs ended during the 2012–13 season especially in a respectful and peaceful atmosphere for each other, although they not played against each other for a long time.

Meraklije today

At the time of Yugoslavia the Meraklije always put especially high value on local patriotism. They do this especially today. Since promotion of the club to the Serbian Superliga, a further upswing is to predict. More and more young and new generations from Niš and Nišava District accepted Radnički Niš as their only club and became its supporters. The number of members rose and some subgroups were founded. Many of the local population have now the opinion that there is nothing more beautiful than the support of his club in their own town or region, so no matter where and no matter in which league the club plays. The Meraklije gather in the south stand of the stadium, from where they support Radnički Niš. The Meraklije created new props, flags, banners, shirts and scarfs and on many of their articles is written: "Nemoj da budeš stranac u svom gradu, oboji grad bojama svog kluba. Budi i ti Meraklija", which roughly translates to "Don't be a stranger in your own city, colour the town with your club's colours. Be a Meraklija." or "Gradska deca uz gradski klub" which roughly means "Children of the City, for the club of their city".  The goal of the Meraklije is to return to the old fame like in the beginning of the 1980s, to continue and encourage the local patriotism, to grow as a group and in their organisation and the creation of a fiery and sports atmosphere at Radnički's matches.

References

Ultras groups
Serbian football supporters' associations
Sport in Niš